The National Pension System (NPS) is a defined-contribution pension system in India regulated by Pension Fund Regulatory and Development Authority (PFRDA) which is under the jurisdiction of Ministry of Finance of the Government of India. National Pension System Trust (NPS Trust) established by PFRDA  is the registered owner of all assets under this scheme. National Pension System, like PPF and EPF is an EEE (Exempt-Exempt-Exempt) instrument in India where the entire corpus escapes tax at maturity and entire pension withdrawal amount is tax-free.

New Pension Scheme was implemented with the decision of the Union Government to replace the Old Pension Scheme which had defined-benefit pensions for all its employees. Notification No. 5/7/2003-ECB issued by Ministry of Finance (Department of Economic Affairs)’s in a Press Release dated 22 December 2003 mandated NPS for all new recruits (except armed forces) joining government services from 1 January 2004 While the scheme was initially designed for government employees only, it was opened up for all citizens of India between the age of 18 and 65 in 2009, for OCI card holders and PIO's in October 2019. On 26 August 2021, PFRDA increased the entry age for the National Pension System (NPS) from 65 years to 70 years. As per the revised norms, any Indian Citizen, resident or non-resident and Overseas Citizen of India (OCI) between the age of 18–70 years can join NPS and continue or defer their NPS Account up to the age of 75 years. It is administered and regulated by the Pension Fund Regulatory and Development Authority (PFRDA).

On 10 December 2018, the Government of India made NPS an entirely tax-free instrument in India where the entire corpus escapes tax at maturity; the 40% annuity also became tax-free. Any individual who is Subscriber of NPS can claim tax benefit for Tier-I account under Sec 80 CCD (1) with in the overall ceiling of ₹1.5 lakh under Sec 80 C of Income Tax Act. 1961. An additional deduction for investment up to ₹50,000 in NPS (Tier I account) is available exclusively to NPS subscribers under subsection 80CCD (1B). The changes in NPS was notified through changes in The Income-tax Act, 1961, during the 2019 Union budget of India.  There is no tax benefit on investment towards Tier II NPS Account. NPS is limited EEE, to the extent of 60%. 40% has to be compulsorily used to purchase an annuity, which is taxable at the applicable tax slab.

Contributions to NPS receive tax exemptions under Section 80C, Section 80CCC and Section 80CCD(1) of Income Tax Act. Starting from 2016, an additional tax benefit of Rs 50,000 under Section 80CCD(1b) is provided under NPS, which is over the ₹1.5 lakh exemption of Section 80C. Private fund managers are important parts of NPS. NPS is considered one of the best tax saving instruments, after 40% of the corpus was made tax-free at the time of maturity and it is ranked just below equity-linked savings scheme (ELSS).

Background
The National Pension System (NPS) is a voluntary defined contribution pension system administered and regulated by the Pension Fund Regulatory and Development Authority (PFRDA), created by an Act of the Parliament of India. The NPS started with the decision of the Government of India to stop defined benefit pensions for all its employees who joined after 1 January 2004. While the scheme was initially designed for government employees only, it was opened up for all citizens of India in 2009. NPS is an attempt by the government to create a pensioned society in India. Today, the NPS is readily available and tax efficient under Section 80CCC and Section 80CCD. Under the NPS, an individual can contribute to his retirement account. Also, his employer can contribute to the welfare and social security of the individual.

NPS is a quasi-EET instrument in India where 40% of the corpus escapes tax at maturity, while 60% of the corpus is taxable. Of the 60% taxable corpus, 40% is tax-exempt as it has to be compulsorily used to purchase an annuity. The annuity income will be taxed, though. The remaining 20% alone will now be taxed at slab rates on withdrawal. In 2017 Union budget of India, 25% exemption of the contribution made by an employee has been announced as a form of premature partial withdrawal in NPS. This amendment will take effect on 1 April 2018 and will, accordingly, apply in relation to the assessment year 2018-19. NPS is a market-linked annuity product.

Regulatory framework
In 1999 the Government of India commissioned a national project, OASIS (an acronym for "old age social and income security"), to examine policies related to old age income security in India. Based on the recommendations of the OASIS report, the Government of India introduced a new Defined Contribution Pension System for the new entrants to Central/State Government service, except to the Defence forces i.e. Army, Navy and Air Force, replacing the existing system of the Defined Benefit Pension System.

On 23 August 2003, the Interim Pension Fund Regulatory & Development Authority (PFRDA) was established through a resolution by the Government of India to "promote old age income security by establishing, developing and regulating pension funds, to protect the interests of subscribers to schemes of pension funds and for matters connected therewith or incidental thereto." The Pension Fund Regulatory & Development Authority Act was passed on 19 September 2013 and notified on 1 February 2014, thus setting up PFRDA as the regulator for pension sector in India. However, there remains a considerable amount of confusion with other entities like the Employee Provident Fund, pension funds run by life insurers, and mutual fund companies being outside the purview of PFRDA.

The contributory pension system was notified by the Government of India on 22 December 2003, now named the National Pension System (NPS) with effect from 1 January 2004. The NPS was subsequently extended to all citizens of the country with effect from 1 May 2009, including self-employed professionals and others in the unorganized sector on a voluntary basis.

Architecture
Unlike traditional financial products where all the functions (sales, operations, service, fund management, depository) are done by one company, NPS follows an unbundled architecture where each step of the value chain has been made disjointed from the other. This unbundling not only allows the customer to mix and match his providers of service through the value chain, picking the best-suited option, but it also curbs the incidence of misselling.

NPS architecture consists of the NPS Trust, which is entrusted with safeguarding subscribers' interests, two privately owned Central Recordkeeping Agencies (CRAs), which maintain the data and records, Point of Presence (POP) as collection, distribution and servicing arms, pension fund managers (PFM) for managing the investments of subscribers, a custodian to take care of the assets purchased by the fund managers, and a trustee bank to manage the banking operations. At age 60 the customer can choose to purchase pension Annuity Service Providers (ASP). NPS investors can't opt for two pension fund managers, neither can switch to another pension fund before a year.  In 2017, PFRDA increased the entry age in NPS to 70 years.

The number of pension fund managers (PFM) has increased to seven in NPS:  SBI Pension Funds is the largest pension fund manager (PFM) in India and its assets under management(AUM) level is ₹61,000 crore.

At present, central government employees have no say in the matter of choice of fund manager or investment allocation in NPS, as both are decided by the government. All the NPS contributions of Central government employees are being distributed evenly across three public sector fund managers :LIC Pension Fund, SBI Pension Fund and UTI Retirement Solutions.

All the major commercial banks, brokers and stock holding corporations perform the role of PoP. The subscriber can choose any one of them. There are seven fund managers and eight annuity service providers for subscribers to choose from. The subscriber can choose to invest either, wholly or in combination, in four types of investment schemes offered by the pension fund managers. These are:

 Scheme E (equity) which allows up to 75% equity participation, this is invested in stocks
 Scheme C (corporate debt) which invests only in high-quality corporate bonds up to 100%
 Scheme G (government/gilt bonds) which invests only in government bonds up to 100%
 Scheme A (alternative investment) which allows up to 5% (newly added asset class only for private sector subscriber with active choice)

Alternatively, the subscriber can opt for the default scheme, whereas per the time left to retirement his portfolio is rebalanced each year for the proportion of equity, corporate bonds, and government bonds.

NPS offers two types of accounts to its subscribers:
 Tier I :The primary account, which is a pension account which has restrictions on withdrawals and utilization of accumulated corpus. All the tax breaks that NPS offers are applicable only to Tier I accounts.
 Tier II: In order to introduce some liquidity to the scheme, the PFRDA allows for a Tier II account where subscribers with pre-existing Tier I accounts can deposit and withdraw money as and when they want. NPS Tier II is an investment account, similar to a mutual fund in characteristics, but offers no Exit load, no commissions, good returns. The Tier 2 NPS account offers tax benefits to government employees under certain conditions.

The contribution to voluntary savings account (also called Tier-II account) can only be made by the subscriber and not by any third party.

PFRDA introduced new features to NPS in 2016, including more choices to lifecycle funds:

 Aggressive Life Cycle Fund (LC-75) which allows subscribers equity exposure of up to 75% till 35 years of age. This is more suitable to a 20s investor.
 Conservative Life Cycle Fund (LC-25) with a 25% starting equity exposure, may be suited to older investors.

The regulator add a new asset class Alternative Investment Funds (AIF) to the existing menu of equities, government securities and corporate bonds, available on NPS.

Who can join
A citizen of India, whether resident or non-resident or an OCI card holder can join NPS (Through a circular issued on 29 October 2019 PFRDA has stated that now Overseas Citizen of India (OCIs) can enrol to invest in NPS tier-1 accounts), subject to the following conditions:
 The subscriber should be between 18 and 70 years old as of the date of submission of his/her application to the Point of Presence (POP) / Point of Presence–Service Provider-Authorized branches of POP for NPS (POP-SP).
 The subscribers should comply with the Know Your Customer (KYC) norms as detailed in the subscriber registration form.
 Should not be Un-discharged insolvent and individuals of unsound mind.
 A non-resident can open an account, but the account will be closed if the citizenship status of the NRI has been changed.
As per circular No: PFRDA/2021/36/SUP-CRA/14 Dated:26.08.2021, those Subscribers who have closed their NPS Accounts are permitted to open a new NPS Account as per increased age eligibility norms, ie. From 65 years to 70 years.

Subscriber base

The Central government employee subscribers grew 4.9% on year to 2.28 million in FY22 while state governments subscribers grew 8.5% to 55.8 lakh during the year. The total number of subscribers as of March 31, 2022, was 5.2 crore, up 23% from a year ago. Total NPS assets under management stood at ₹7,36,000 crore as of March 31, 2022, up from ₹5,78,000 crore as on March 31, 2021

Withdrawal
Premature withdrawal in NPS before age 60 required parking 80% of the sum in an annuity. One can withdraw 20 percent of the corpus before 60 years but he/she must buy annuity with 80 percent of the corpus. In 2016, the NPS allowed withdrawal of up to 25% of contributions for specified reasons, if the scheme is at least 3 years old with certain conditions. 
One can withdraw the complete amount if the pension collected is less than ₹5,00,000. This amount was increased to ₹5,00,000 as per PFRDA Circular dated 14 June 2021.

Tax benefits
Investment in NPS is eligible for tax benefits as follows:
 Up to ₹1,50,000 under Section 80CCD(1). The benefit is additionally capped at 10% of basic salary. The benefit under Section 80C, Section 80CCC and Section 80CCD(1) is capped at ₹1,50,000.
 Contribution Up to ₹50,000 under Section 80CCD(1B). This is over and above tax benefit under Section 80C.
 Employer co-contribution up to 10% of basic and DA without any upper cap in terms of amount is tax free income in hands of employees under Section 80CCD(2).

See also
 Old Pension Scheme (OPS)
 Pensions in India
 Equity-linked savings scheme (ELSS)
 Mutual fund
 Income tax in India

References

External links
PFRDA
FAQ for Pensioners
pension calculator

Public pension funds
Pensions in India
Tax-advantaged savings plans in India
Government finances in India
Indian labour law
2004 establishments in India